Carris is a surname. Notable people with the surname include:

 Bertram Carris (1917–2000), English cricketer
 Harold Carris (1909–1959), English cricketer
 William Carris (born 1944), American politician

See also
 Caris (name)
 Carri
 Carris Museum, museum in Lisbon